C. Milton Wright High School  is a public secondary school located in Bel Air, Maryland, United States. It was founded in 1980 with Robert Garbacik as its first principal.  The school is named after Charles Milton Wright, a former superintendent of the Harford County Public Schools system.

School information 

C. Milton Wright High School offers 19 Advanced Placement (AP) classes. In 2004, 80% of C. Milton students who took AP Exams achieved a score of a 3 or higher.

Athletics 

At C. Milton, many students participate in multiple sports throughout the school year. The C. Milton Wright High School baseball program ranks among the elite in the United States.  Since 2006, the Mustangs have appeared in the Maryland State Championship three times, winning the title in their latest appearance (2010).  With a final record of 23–0, C. Milton was ranked 8th nationally and 1st on the east coast by the "USA Today Super 25 High School Baseball Poll." 

C. Milton Wright's Cross Country Teams won Maryland state titles in 1988, 1999, 2000, 2001, 2002, 2004, 2007, and 2008, qualifying for Nike Team Nationals in 2004, being Maryland state runners-up in 1985, 1992, 1993, 1994, 1996, 1998, 2001, 2002, and 2003, and winning the Harford County Championship every year for 21 years from 1987 to 2008. The team recently was state runners-up in 2017.

C. Milton Wright's basketball team became state champions in 2016.

Fall Sports:
 Men's Soccer
 Women's Soccer
 Men's Volleyball
 Women's Volleyball
 Cross Country
 Golf
 Football
 Fall Cheerleading
 Field Hockey
Winter Sports:
 Swimming
 Indoor Track
 Wrestling
 Men's Basketball
 Women's Basketball
 Winter Cheerleading
Spring Sports:
 Men's Basebell
 Women's Softball
 Tennis
 Track & Field
 Lacrosse

Honors societies and selective groups
National Honor Society
Spanish National Honor Society
French National Honor Society
German National Honor Society
National Art Honor Society
Mu Alpha Theta (Math National Honors Society)
Science National Honor Society
Rho Kappa (Social Studies Honors Society)
Tri-M Music Honor Society
 International Thespian Society

Competitive teams
Forensics (Speech and Debate Team)
 Mock Trial
Academic Team
Envirothon Team
Math League
Mustang Cheerleading Team

Event planning groups
Student Government Association (SGA)
Sophomore Class Council
Junior Class Council
Senior Class Council

Notable alumni
Colin Miller – United Soccer League goalkeeper
Jay Witasick – Major League Baseball pitcher
Kim Waters - Class of 1982 -  jazz artist

References

External links 
 

Bel Air, Harford County, Maryland
Harford County Public Schools
Public high schools in Maryland
Educational institutions established in 1980
1980 establishments in Maryland